Pronola magniplaga is a moth in the subfamily Arctiinae. It was described by Schaus in 1899. It is found in the Brazilian state of São Paulo and Bolivia.

References

Moths described in 1899
Lithosiini